Luis María "Billy" Cafaro (1 November 1936 – 4 September 2021) was an Argentine rock and roll singer. He was one of the pioneers of Argentine rock.

Discography
Pity Pity / Tú eres (1958)
Bailando con Billy (1959)
Kriminal tango / A tu lado (1959)
Bésame Pepita (1960)
OK Billy (1960)
En el silencio azul / Un dios de arena (1973)
Pity, Pity (1989)
Dos almas (1998)
20 Grandes Éxitos (1999)
Con un tango en el bolsillo (2006)

References

External links
 
 

1936 births
2021 deaths
20th-century Argentine male singers
Musicians from Buenos Aires